The NSW Premier's History Awards honour distinguished achievement in the interpretation of history, through both the written word and non-print media by Australian citizens and permanent residents of Australia.

History
The State Government of New South Wales, Australia established the Premier's History Awards in 1997, which were devised by members of the History Council of NSW including Max Kelly, Paul Ashton and Shirley Fitzgerald. In 2005 the name of the awards was changed to NSW Premier's History Awards. The awards are presented annually in early September and are managed by the State Library of NSW, in association with Create NSW (former Arts NSW).

Categories
The following awards, each of $15,000 are offered:
 Australian History Prize for a major published book or e-book on Australian history.
 General History Prize for a major published book or e-book on international history.
 NSW Community and Regional History Prize for a published book or e-book that makes a significant contribution to the understanding of community. institutional, urban or regional history in New South Wales.
 Young People's History Prize for a published book or e-book, film, television or radio program, CD-ROM, DVD, or website – fiction or non-fiction – that increases the understanding and appreciation of history by children and young adults.
 Digital History Prize for an Australian historian's interpretation of an historical subject using non-print media.
 John and Patricia Ward History prize to encourage the use of archives in the writing of history. (discontinued)

The Australian History Prize
In 2014, an Australian Military History Prize was announced. Mike Carlton was the winner of this sub-category for his book First Victory (published by Random House).

The General History Prize

The NSW Community and Regional History Prize

The Young People's History Prize
(known as the Children's History Prize until 2002)

Digital History Prize 
(known as The Audio/Visual History Prize until 2009 and the Multimedia Prize until 2019)

Former Categories

State Records – John and Patricia Ward History Prize

This prize was first awarded in 2002 to encourage the use of archives in the writing of history.  The State Record established the prize in recognition of the contribution to history and archives of NSW by John and Patricia Ward.

The Centenary of Federation Prize, 2001
The centenary award was created as a one-off presentation, the prize being sponsored by the NSW Centenary of Federation Committee.  This award was for a "major work" relating to the Australian Federation period focussing on the political, social and cultural issues of Australia at that time.

Winner

Shortlisted

See also
 Australian literature
 List of Australian literary awards
 List of history awards
 Australian History Awards
 Victorian Community History Awards
 Northern Territory History Awards
 Prime Minister's Prize for Australian History

References

External links
 Arts NSW
 2001 NSW Premier's History Awards Arts NSW, (Retrieved 18 July 2007)
 2003 Fellowships, Scholarships and Awards Arts NSW, (Retrieved 18 July 2007)
 2004 Fellowships, Scholarships and Awards Arts NSW, (Retrieved 18 July 2007)
 2006 NSW Premier's History Awards & Fellowships Arts NSW, (Retrieved 17 July 2007)
 
 2012 NSW Premier's History Awards State Library of New South Wales, (Retrieved 5 December 2012)

Australia history-related lists
Australian non-fiction book awards
Australian literary awards
Australian history awards
Awards established in 1997